Lissochlora is a genus of moths in the family Geometridae described by Warren in 1900.

Species
Lissochlora albociliaria Herrich-Schäffer, [1855]
Lissochlora alboseriata Warren, 1900
Lissochlora bryata Felder & Rogenhofer, 1875
Lissochlora calida Dognin, 1898
Lissochlora cecilia Prout, 1912
Lissochlora daniloi Pitkin, 1993
Lissochlora diarita Dognin, 1898
Lissochlora discipuncta Warren, 1900
Lissochlora eugethes Prout, 1912
Lissochlora freddyi Pitkin, 1993
Lissochlora hena Dognin, 1898
Lissochlora hoffmannsi Prout, 1932
Lissochlora inconspicua Bastelberger, 1911
Lissochlora jenna Dognin, 1898
Lissochlora jenna ssp. salubris Prout, 1932
Lissochlora jocularia Dognin, 1923
Lissochlora latuta Dognin, 1898
Lissochlora licada Dognin, 1898
Lissochlora liriata Dognin, 1898
Lissochlora manostigma Dyar, 1912
Lissochlora molliculata Warren, 1904
Lissochlora mollissima Dognin, 1892
Lissochlora monospilonota Prout, 1916
Lissochlora multiseriata Dognin, 1923
Lissochlora nigricornis Warren, 1907
Lissochlora nigripes Dognin, 1911
Lissochlora nortia Druce, 1892
Lissochlora paegnia Prout, 1932
Lissochlora pasama Dognin, 1898
Lissochlora pectinifera Prout, 1916
Lissochlora punctiseriata Dognin, 1910
Lissochlora purpureotincta Warren, 1900
Lissochlora quotidiana Prout, 1932
Lissochlora rhodonota Prout, 1916
Lissochlora ronaldi Pitkin, 1993
Lissochlora vividata Prout, 1932
Lissochlora viridilinea Prout, 1916
Lissochlora viridilinea ssp. cushiensis Prout, 1932
Lissochlora viridifimbria Dognin, 1911
Lissochlora venilineata Warren, 1907
Lissochlora stacta Prout, 1932
Lissochlora sanguinipunctata Dognin, 1906
Lissochlora rufoseriata Prout, 1917
Lissochlora rufipicta Prout, 1910
Lissochlora rufiguttata Warren, 1900

References

Geometridae